McNeil is an unincorporated community in Caldwell County, in the U.S. state of Texas. According to the Handbook of Texas, the community had a population of 200 in 2000. It is located within the Greater Austin metropolitan area.

History
A Baptist church called the McNeil Creek Baptist Church was established in the community in June 1888. It was reported to have 200 members in 1983. A church and a cemetery marked the community on county highway maps in the late 1980s. The population of the community was 200 through 2000. It was also a thriving farm community settled by immigrants after the American Civil War. Harvey King was the unofficial "Mayor of McNeil." As of 2010, the McNeil Creek Baptist Church and a cemetery that occupied land first donated to a Methodist church established by Margaret Smith Hinds in Soda Springs around 1867 are what remain in McNeil. Benton I. McCarley, who was killed in World War I, is buried in the community's cemetery, and the American Legion Post in Luling was named for him.

Geography

Education
McNeil had two schools in 1905. Both of them were one-teacher school buildings, with one school serving the community's 57 White students and the other school serving the community's 45 African American students. They were then joined with the Luling Independent School District in 1948. The community is still served by the Luling ISD to this day.

References

Unincorporated communities in Caldwell County, Texas
Unincorporated communities in Texas